René Rillon (9 May 1892 – 13 October 1956) was a French cyclist. He competed in two events at the 1912 Summer Olympics.

References

External links
 

1892 births
1956 deaths
French male cyclists
Olympic cyclists of France
Cyclists at the 1912 Summer Olympics
Cyclists from Paris